Mabel Hubbard may refer to:

Mabel Gardiner Hubbard (1857–1923), American businesswoman
Mabel Houze Hubbard (1936–2006), American judge